BBCM may refer to:

 Bad Boy Club Montréal
 BBC Monitoring
 Butcher, Baker, Candlestickmaker, spin-off comic miniseries of The Boys, following Billy Butcher
 "Butcher, Baker, Candlestick Maker" (The Boys), television adaptation of the comic miniseries